Rhododendron crinigerum (长粗毛杜鹃) is a rhododendron species native to northwestern Sichuan, southeastern Xizang, and northwestern Yunnan, China, where it grows at altitudes of . Flowers are white to pink, with purple flecks and basal blotch.

References
 Franchet, J. Bot. (Morot). 12: 260. 1898.

crinigerum
Flora of China
Flora of Tibet